James Badge Dale (born May 1, 1978) is an American actor. He is known for playing Chase Edmunds in 24, Robert Leckie in The Pacific, a corrupt Massachusetts state trooper, Trooper Barrigan, in Martin Scorsese's The Departed, Luke Lewenden in The Grey, Eric Savin in Iron Man 3 and Tyrone S. "Rone" Woods in 13 Hours.

Early years 
Born in New York City, Dale is the only child of actor, dancer, and choreographer Grover Dale and actress and singer Anita Morris. At age 10, he was picked out of his fifth grade class at Wonderland Avenue Elementary School in Laurel Canyon, Los Angeles to test for the role of Simon in Lord of the Flies, in which he was cast. After five months on location in Jamaica, he returned to his schooling at Wonderland Elementary.
He is an alumnus of Manhattanville College, where he played for the hockey team until he suffered a leg injury.

Career 
His most notable works to date are Simon in the 1990 film adaptation of Lord of the Flies and the role of Chase Edmunds in the third season of the Fox TV series 24 (which he later reprised in the video game of the same title). He also appeared in CSI: Miami and CSI: NY as serial killer Henry Darius. The storyline originally began in the CSI: Miami Season 4 episode "Felony" and ended in the CSI: NY Season 2 episode "Manhattan Manhunt", resulting in a crossover between the two shows.

In 2006, he was cast in the pivotal supporting role of Trooper Barrigan in The Departed. He then was cast as the lead in AMC's political thriller Rubicon which revolves around a secret society that pulls the strings on the world political stage like the alleged Illuminati and the Council on Foreign Relations. It centers on brilliant analyst Will Travers (Dale) discovering that his employers are not who they seem to be. He also stars as Robert Leckie, one of the three leads in the HBO miniseries The Pacific from executive producers Tom Hanks and Steven Spielberg.

In 2013, Dale played Eric Savin in the Marvel Comics-based Iron Man 3, Captain Speke in the science fiction thriller World War Z, Dan Reid (the title character's brother) in Disney's The Lone Ranger, and the brother of Lee Harvey Oswald in Parkland. In Fall 2014, he starred in the off-Broadway production of Small Engine Repair.

Personal life 
Dale has a son, Cassius Wickersham Dale, born December 30, 2021, with girlfriend Emily Wickersham.

Filmography

Film

Television and video games

References

External links 

 

1978 births
American male film actors
American male stage actors
American male television actors
Living people
Manhattanville College alumni
Male actors from New York City
20th-century American male actors
21st-century American male actors
American male child actors